

tro

trob-tron
Trobicin
Trocaine
Trocal
trocimine (INN)
troclosene potassium (INN)
trodusquemine (USAN)
Trofan
trofosfamide (INN)
troglitazone (INN)
troleandomycin (INN)
trolnitrate (INN)
tromantadine (INN)
Trombovar
trometamol (INN)
Tromoject
Tronolane
Tronothane

trop-trox
tropabazate (INN)
tropanserin (INN)
tropantiol (USAN)
tropapride (INN)
tropatepine (INN)
tropenziline bromide (INN)
Trophamine
Tropicacyl
tropicamide (INN)
tropigline (INN)
tropirine (INN)
tropisetron (INN)
troplasminogen alfa (USAN, INN)
tropodifene (INN)
troquidazole (INN)
trospectomycin (INN)
trospium chloride (INN)
trovafloxacin (INN)
Trovan
trovirdine (INN)
troxerutin (INN)
troxipide (INN)
troxolamide (INN)
troxonium tosilate (INN)
troxypyrrolium tosilate (INN)

tru-try
Truphylline
Trusopt
Truxazole
Truxcillin
truxicurium iodide (INN)
truxipicurium iodide (INN)
Trymex
tryparsamide (INN)
Tryptacin
Trysul

tu-tw
tuaminoheptane (INN)
Tubersol
tubocurarine chloride (INN)
tubulozole (INN)
tucaresol (INN)
Tucks (Johnson & Johnson)
tuclazepam (INN)
tucotuzumab celmoleukin (USAN)
Tuinal (Eli Lilly and Company)
tulathromycin (USAN)
tulobuterol (INN)
tulopafant (INN)
Tums (GlaxoSmithKline)
Turgex
turoctocog alfa (INN)
turofexorate isopropyl (USAN)
turosteride (INN)
Tusibron
Tussafed
Tussigon
Tussionex (UCB)
Tusstat
tuvatidine (INN)
tuvirumab (INN)
Twinject (Amedra Pharmaceuticals)
Twinrix (GlaxoSmithKline)

ty-tz
tybamate (INN)
Tycolet
Tylenol (Johnson & Johnson)
tylosin (INN)
Tylox
tylvalosin (USAN)
Tymtran
Typherix
tyromedan (INN)
tyrosine (INN)
tyrothricin (INN)
Tysabri
Tyzine
Tz-3